Khin Maung Hla is the incumbent Advocate General of Sagaing Region,  Myanmar (Burma). He is a member of Sagaing Region Government.

He serving as a Regional Advocate General of Sagaing Region.

See also 
Sagaing Region Government

References

Living people
Year of birth missing (living people)
21st-century Burmese lawyers